The first round of the 2008–09 UEFA Cup began on 16 September 2008, which narrowed clubs down to 40 teams in preparation for the group stage.

Seeding

Summary

|-
!colspan="5"|Group 1

|-
!colspan="5"|Group 2

|-
!colspan="5"|Group 3

|-
!colspan="5"|Group 4

|-
!colspan="5"|Group 5

|-
!colspan="5"|Group 6

|-
!colspan="5"|Group 7

|-
!colspan="5"|Group 8

|}

First leg

Second leg

Hertha BSC won 2–0 on aggregate.

Schalke 04 won 5–2 on aggregate.

Olympiacos won 7–0 on aggregate.

CSKA Moscow won 3–1 on aggregate.

Rosenborg won 5–3 on aggregate.

Stuttgart won 4–3 on aggregate.

Rennes 2–2 Twente on aggregate. Twente won on away goals.

Ajax won 6–1 on aggregate.

Tottenham Hotspur won 3–2 on aggregate.

Copenhagen won 3–2 on aggregate.

MŠK Žilina won 2–1 on aggregate.

Borussia Dortmund 2–2 Udinese on aggregate. Udinese won 4–3 on penalties.

Braga won 6–0 on aggregate.

Feyenoord 2–2 Kalmar on aggregate. Feyenoord won on away goals.

Hamburg won 2–0 on aggregate.

Saint-Étienne won 4–2 on aggregate.

Milan won 4–1 on aggregate.

Partizan won 3–1 on aggregate.

Aston Villa won 4–2 on aggregate.

Lech Poznań won 5–4 on aggregate.

Heerenveen won 6–3 on aggregate.

Brann 2–2 Deportivo La Coruña on aggregate. Deportivo La Coruña won 3–2 on penalties.

Slavia Prague 1–1 Vaslui on aggregate. Slavia Prague won on away goals.

Spartak Moscow won 2–1 on aggregate.

Metalist Kharkiv won 4–2 on aggregate.

Portsmouth won 4–2 on aggregate.

Paris Saint-Germain won 2–1 on aggregate.

Sevilla won 4–0 on aggregate.

Wolfsburg won 2–1 on aggregate.

Sampdoria won 7–1 on aggregate.

Valencia won 3–1 on aggregate.

Dinamo Zagreb 3–3 Sparta Prague on aggregate. Dinamo Zagreb won on away goals.

Manchester City won 4–2 on aggregate.

Club Brugge won 4–2 on aggregate.

Nancy won 3–0 on aggregate.

Standard Liège won 4–3 on aggregate.

Benfica won 4–3 on aggregate.

Galatasaray won 6–4 on aggregate.

NEC won 1–0 on aggregate.

Racing Santander won 2–0 on aggregate.

External links
Qualifying Rounds Information

First Round
September 2008 sports events in Europe
October 2008 sports events in Europe
UEFA Cup qualifying rounds